WFCI was one of four radio stations in the pre-World War II Providence market (the others being WPRO, WEAN and WJAR).  WFCI was an affiliate of the NBC Blue network, which in 1943 became simply the Blue Network, and finally changed to the American Broadcasting Company (ABC) in 1945.  WFCI added FM service on 101.5 MHz in about 1950; on that frequency today is WWBB.

The first WFCI (1927-1933)
A listing for WFCI Pawtucket dates from at least 1927, owned by Frank Crook. WFCI was on 1330 kHz on or before June 30, 1927, with 50 watts, then moving to 1240 kHz (not yet a Class IV frequency as it would become under NARBA) a year later. WFCI's first studio/office location was at 450 Main Street in Pawtucket. The original WFCI became WPAW which shared time with WPRO, and was merged into WPRO in May 1933.

The second WFCI (1941-1954)
WFCI was then restarted on March 29, 1941. W. Paul Oury was general manager, and George Sutherland was program director. The station became a Mutual affiliate as of June 1, 1942 (prior to that it had served as WEAN's overflow station).  WFCI moved to the Biltmore Hotel in Providence in 1949 and took WEAN's ABC affiliation. WFCI was relicensed to Providence in 1950.

WFCI was sold to the Providence Journal-Bulletin in 1952; the newspaper changed the callsign to WPJB, matching their radio station on 105.1 MHz (now WWLI). When the Journal-Bulletin bought WEAN in 1954, it surrendered WPJB's license back to the Federal Communications Commission (FCC).

1420 was not silent long, as WBSM in New Bedford, Massachusetts, was given permission to move to 1420 in 1956 where it remains to this day.

Programming
Buddy & The Gang.
Cavaliere Antonio Pace hosted an Italian program which had originated at WPRO & was also heard at one time on WRIB.

Personnel
T.F. Allen: Advertising & Commercial head (1941)
Frank Crook: Founder.
W. Paul Oury: general manager (1941)
Arthur Paquette: Host of the "1420 Club" (1942)
Anita Ramos: Supervisor of foreign broadcasts.
Mark Sheeler: Disc jockey (1948)
George Sutherland: program director (1941).
Howard W. Thornley: chief engineer (1941).
Wallace A. Walker: General Manager (1946)

References

Defunct radio stations in the United States
FCI (defunct)
Pawtucket, Rhode Island
Radio stations established in 1926
1933 disestablishments in Rhode Island
Radio stations established in 1941
1954 disestablishments in Rhode Island
Radio stations disestablished in 1954
1926 establishments in Rhode Island
1941 establishments in Rhode Island
Radio stations disestablished in 1933
FCI